Alexander Shevchenko (born August 20, 1992) is a Russian professional ice hockey player. He is currently playing with Admiral Vladivostok of the Kontinental Hockey League (KHL).

Shevchenko made his Kontinental Hockey League (KHL) debut playing with Atlant Moscow Oblast during the 2012–13 KHL season.

References

External links

1992 births
Living people
Admiral Vladivostok players
Atlant Moscow Oblast players
Metallurg Novokuznetsk players
Russian ice hockey forwards
HC Sochi players
HC Vityaz players
HC Yugra players
People from Belgorod
Sportspeople from Belgorod Oblast